Cheating Cheaters is a 1919 silent film comedy directed by Allan Dwan and starring Jack Holt and Clara Kimball Young. Young's production company produced. It was released by Select Pictures Corporation.

Kathryn Stuart was the writer, based on a 1916 Broadway play of the same name by Max Marcin.

Cast
Jack Holt - Tom Palmer
Clara Kimball Young - Ruth Brockton
Tully Marshall - Ira Lazarre
Frank Campeau - Steven Wilson
Edwin Stevens - Mr. Palmer
Anna Q. Nilsson - Grace Palmer
Frederick Burton - George Brockton
Nicholas Dunaew - Antonio Verdi
Mayme Kelso - Mrs. Bockton
Jess Singleton - Phil
Elinor Hancock - Mrs. Palmer
William A. Carroll - Ruth's chauffeur

Preservation
Is now a lost film.

References

External links
Cheating Cheaters at IMDb.com

1919 films
American silent feature films
Lost American films
Films directed by Allan Dwan
American films based on plays
American black-and-white films
1919 comedy films
Silent American comedy films
Selznick Pictures films
1919 lost films
Lost comedy films
1910s American films
1910s English-language films